Lepidoneura is a genus of moths of the family Crambidae.

Species
Lepidoneura africalis Hampson, 1899
Lepidoneura grisealis Hampson, 1900

Former species
Lepidoneura longipalpis Swinhoe, 1894

References

Spilomelinae
Crambidae genera
Taxa named by George Hampson